The 1981 Commonwealth Heads of Government Meeting was the sixth Meeting of the Heads of Government of the Commonwealth of Nations.  It was held in Melbourne, Victoria, between 30 September 1981 and 7 October 1981, and was hosted by that country's Prime Minister, Malcolm Fraser.

At the meeting the Melbourne Declaration was agreed which "clarifies and extends the Commonwealth commitment to a fair international economic and financial system, and support for struggling poor countries."

References

1981
Diplomatic conferences in Australia
20th-century diplomatic conferences
1981 conferences
1981 in international relations
1981 in Australia
Australia and the Commonwealth of Nations
Royal visits to Australia
1980s in Melbourne
September 1981 events in Australia
October 1981 events in Australia